Peepeekisis Cree Nation (Band number 384)(pîhpîkisîs, literal meaning: Sparrow Hawk) is a Cree First Nation in southern Saskatchewan, Canada.

Population 
A census report for 2021 by Indigenous and Northern Affairs Canada of the Government of Canada placed the total registered population at 3,148, with 726 people on a reserve or other band land and 2,422 off reserve.

History 
Chief Can-ah-ha-cha-pew (Making Ready the Bow) signed Treaty 4 on September 21, 1874.

In 1896, when Indian Agent W.M. Graham arrived at the agency, the band was without a leader and was unable to prevent Graham’s creation of the File Hills Colony (1898) on the reserve. The plan brought young male industrial school graduates (members of bands other than Peepeekisis) to live, farm and eventually become members of the Peepeekisis Band. The original Peepeekisis Band members were displaced from their homes and deprived of the use of their communal lands. Their complaints led in 1945 to questions raised about the validity of the transfers into the band, but it was not until 1986 that they were able to submit a specific claim to the Department of Indian Affairs. 

In 2004, the Indian Claims Commission found Canada in breach of its lawful obligations to the band, and recommended that the claim be accepted for negotiation under Canada’s Specific Claims Policy. It has yet to be settled. The band’s infrastructure includes a band office, gymnasium, school, health clinic, and other maintenance facilities; it has a membership of 2,215 people, 607 of whom live on reserve.\

In 2021, the Peepeekisis Cree Nation and the federal government reached a $150 million settlement. On August 3, 2022, Marc Miller, the Minister of Crown–Indigenous Relations, apologized in Peepeekisis Cree Nation, acknowledging that the federal government's "radical social engineering" had resulted in cultural loss through restrictive land and household access as well as a ban on cultural practices.

In September 2022, the Peepeekisis Cree Nation completed its acquisition of the Temple Gardens Hotel & Spa in Moose Jaw.

References

First Nations in Saskatchewan